Tiger meat is a raw beef dish. Recipes vary, but common ingredients include: raw beef, raw egg, onion, salt, pepper, and other seasonings.  It is sometimes also  referred to as a "Cannibal Sandwich." It is traditionally consumed at Christmas, especially in Wisconsin.

Preparation involves simply mixing the ingredients together in a bowl, and then serving it on crackers. It is closely related to steak tartare, and is common in Midwestern US states with significant German populations, such as North Dakota, South Dakota, Wisconsin and Minnesota. 

In southern Brazil it's called 'carne de onça', meaning jaguar meat.

See also
Mett

References

Raw beef dishes
Cuisine of the Midwestern United States